The 1999 season in Swedish football, starting January 1999 and ending December 1999:

Honours

Official titles

Competitions

Promotions, relegations and qualifications

Promotions

League transfers

Relegations

International qualifications

Domestic results

Allsvenskan 1999

Allsvenskan qualification play-off 1999

Division 1 Norra 1999

Division 1 Södra 1999

Superettan qualification play-off 1999 
1st round, 1st group

1st round, 2nd group

2nd round

Svenska Cupen 1998–99 
Final

National team results

Notes

References 
Print

Online

 
Seasons in Swedish football